Ariamnes is a genus of comb-footed spiders (family Theridiidae) that was first described by Tamerlan Thorell in 1869. Some species have greatly elongated abdomens, making them resemble a twig.

Species

 it contains thirty-three species and one subspecies, found in Asia, Africa, South America, Oceania, the Caribbean, Costa Rica, and Mexico:
Ariamnes alepeleke Gillespie & Rivera, 2007 – Hawaii
Ariamnes attenuatus O. Pickard-Cambridge, 1881 – Costa Rica, Caribbean to Argentina
Ariamnes birgitae Strand, 1917 – Myanmar
Ariamnes campestratus Simon, 1903 – Gabon, Congo
Ariamnes colubrinus Keyserling, 1890 – Australia (Queensland, New South Wales, Lord Howe Is.)
Ariamnes columnaceus Gao & Li, 2014 – China
Ariamnes corniger Simon, 1900 – Hawaii
Ariamnes cylindrogaster Simon, 1889 – China, Laos, Korea, Taiwan, Japan
Ariamnes flagellum (Doleschall, 1857) (type) – Southeast Asia, Australia
Ariamnes f. nigritus Simon, 1901 – Southeast Asia
Ariamnes haitensis (Exline & Levi, 1962) – Hispaniola
Ariamnes helminthoides Simon, 1907 – Guinea-Bissau
Ariamnes hiwa Gillespie & Rivera, 2007 – Hawaii
Ariamnes huinakolu Gillespie & Rivera, 2007 – Hawaii
Ariamnes jeanneli Berland, 1920 – East Africa
Ariamnes kahili Gillespie & Rivera, 2007 – Hawaii
Ariamnes laau Gillespie & Rivera, 2007 – Hawaii
Ariamnes longissimus Keyserling, 1891 – Peru, Brazil
Ariamnes makue Gillespie & Rivera, 2007 – Hawaii
Ariamnes melekalikimaka Gillespie & Rivera, 2007 – Hawaii
Ariamnes mexicanus (Exline & Levi, 1962) – Mexico, Cuba
Ariamnes patersoniensis Hickman, 1927 – Australia (Tasmania)
Ariamnes pavesii Leardi, 1902 – India, Sri Lanka
Ariamnes petilus Gao & Li, 2014 – China
Ariamnes poele Gillespie & Rivera, 2007 – Hawaii
Ariamnes rufopictus Thorell, 1895 – Myanmar
Ariamnes russulus Simon, 1903 – Equatorial Guinea
Ariamnes schlingeri (Exline & Levi, 1962) – Peru
Ariamnes setipes Hasselt, 1882 – Indonesia (Sumatra)
Ariamnes simulans O. Pickard-Cambridge, 1892 – India
Ariamnes triangulatus Urquhart, 1887 – New Zealand
Ariamnes triangulus Thorell, 1887 – Myanmar
Ariamnes uwepa Gillespie & Rivera, 2007 – Hawaii
Ariamnes waikula Gillespie & Rivera, 2007 – Hawaii

In synonymy:
A. approximatus O. Pickard-Cambridge, 1894 = Ariamnes attenuatus O. Pickard-Cambridge, 1881
A. gracillimus O. Pickard-Cambridge, 1894 = Ariamnes attenuatus O. Pickard-Cambridge, 1881
A. pulcher Soares & Camargo, 1948 = Ariamnes attenuatus O. Pickard-Cambridge, 1881
A. sinuatus Schenkel, 1953 = Ariamnes attenuatus O. Pickard-Cambridge, 1881

See also
 List of Theridiidae species

References

Araneomorphae genera
Cosmopolitan spiders
Taxa named by Tamerlan Thorell
Theridiidae